A Cape Horner is a captain of a sailing ship which has sailed around Cape Horn, and who is a member of the Association Amicale Internationale des Capitaines au Long-Cours-Cap Horniers.

The following countries have all been active members of AMICALE: Germany, Australia, Belgium, Canada, Chile, Denmark, the United States of America, Finland, the Netherlands, UK, Åland, Italy, Norway, New Zealand and Sweden.

Due to the death of most of its members, the Federated Congress of AMICALE decided to put an end to the international entity, which was definitively dissolved on May 15, 2003. However, the following countries have decided to continue their activities independently : Germany (ending mid-September 2004), Australia, Chile, Finland, England, Aland Islands and New Zealand. To this relationship must be added the Caphorniers Foundation of Holland and the Cape Horn Club of Norway, both made up of sympathizers of the original Brotherhoods. A small French group also continues, as does an official Chilean group sponsored and supported by the Chilean Navy: the Chilean Section of the Cape Horn Captains Brotherhood, the "Cape Horners".

Cape Horner may also refer to a ship that has rounded Cape Horn.

Balclutha rounded Cape Horn a record 17 times in thirteen years, with a crew of 26.

A Cape Horner that has passed the Horn, the Cape of Good Hope (South Africa), and Cape Leeuwin (Australia) is known as a three cap.

Gallery

References

External links

French Cape Horners
Chilean Section of the Cape Horn Captains Brotherhood - The Cape Horners
Dutch Cape Horners Foundation
The Finnish Association of Cape Horners (Äland)
(British) 'International' Association of Cape Horners
National Maritime Museum, Archive
Port Victoria Maritime Museum: A Maritime Museum commemorating the journeys of the Cape Horners made to Port Victoria in South Australia
Tour Solidor, St Malo, France. Cape Horners Museum.

Sailing